The 1998 Korean Basketball League rookie draft (Korean: 1998 KBL 국내신인선수 드래프트) was held on March 9, 1998, at Hilton Hotel's convention center in Seoul, South Korea. It was the first ever rookie draft since domestic basketball transitioned into the professional era and the Korean Basketball League was established in 1997.

Draft selections
This table only shows the first twenty picks.

Players
For a league known for producing top-notch guards, the first four overall picks were forwards, with Shin Ki-sung before the highest-ranked guard at 7th. Shin, now a SPOTV commentator, would go on to forge a successful career spanning fourteen years. Other than Hyun, the other players picked before him failed to establish themselves and had brief playing careers, leading to Shin being described as the "biggest steal" of the draft.

Pyo Myung-il, also a guard and the 8th overall pick, went on to win the Sixth Man Award and Skill Development Award. He died on January 12, 2022, days before the KBL All-Star Game was scheduled to take place and was honored with a minute's silence prior to the game.

Notes

See also
Korean Basketball League draft

References

External links
 Draft: 1998 KBL Domestic Player draft results / 드래프트: 1998 KBL 국내신인선수 드래프트 결과 — Korean Basketball League official website 

Korean Basketball League draft
Korean Basketball League draft
1990s in Seoul
Korean Basketball League draft
Sport in Seoul
Events in Seoul